Rui Fernando da Silva Calapez Pereira Bento (born 14 January 1972) is a Portuguese former footballer who played mostly as a central defender, currently manager of the Kuwait national team.

Over 13 seasons, he amassed Primeira Liga totals of 321 matches and five goals, representing mainly Boavista (nine years). He managed S.C. Beira-Mar and Tondela in the top flight, and spent several years coaching Portugal's youth teams.

Club career
Born in Silves, Algarve, Bento first represented S.L. Benfica, but would gain national recognition with Boavista FC. Already relocated as a defensive midfielder, he helped them to their only Primeira Liga championship in the 2000–01 season, adding the 1997 Taça de Portugal.

After three years at Sporting CP, battling with namesake Paulo Bento for first-choice status and winning another league title in 2002, Bento retired from playing at the age of 32, and started coaching at lowly Académico de Viseu FC. In summer 2008 he returned to Boavista with the club now in the second division, and the side eventually suffered a second consecutive relegation.

Bento was appointed at S.C. Beira-Mar midway through the 2010–11 after taking the place of Leonardo Jardim, only winning twice in nine top-division games until the end of the campaign (two draws and five losses) but still leading the Aveiro team away from the relegation zone. He resigned on 26 February 2012.

After some time managing the under-23 side of Al-Ahli Saudi FC, Bento signed as manager of Bangkok United F.C. in January 2014. He left early on in the Thai Premier League season.

On 6 October 2015, Bento returned to Portugal's top flight, succeeding Vítor Paneira at 16th-placed C.D. Tondela on a deal to the end of the campaign. He left by mutual accord on 8 December after earning a solitary point from five matches, placing the club in last position.

International career
Bento was capped six times for Portugal. His first game took place at 20 November 1991 in a 1–0 win over Greece for the UEFA Euro 1992 qualifiers, and his last was a 4–0 defeat to France on 25 April 2001, in a friendly.

Bento also played Olympic football, helping the national side to finish fourth at the 1996 Summer Olympics in Atlanta. Previously, he was a starter for the 1991 FIFA World Youth Championship winners, in a competition played on home soil.

In July 2009, Bento was named the Portugal under-17 manager. He and Emílio Peixe left the Portuguese Football Federation set-up in August 2022, to take the helm at Kuwait's senior and Olympic teams, respectively.

Honours
Benfica
Supertaça Cândido de Oliveira runner-up: 1991

Boavista
Primeira Liga: 2000–01
Taça de Portugal: 1996–97
Supertaça Cândido de Oliveira: 1992, 1997

Sporting CP
Primeira Liga: 2001–02
Taça de Portugal: 2001–02

Portugal U-20
FIFA U-20 World Cup: 1991

References

External links

1972 births
Living people
People from Silves, Portugal
Sportspeople from Faro District
Portuguese footballers
Association football defenders
Association football midfielders
Association football utility players
Primeira Liga players
S.L. Benfica footballers
Boavista F.C. players
Sporting CP footballers
Portugal youth international footballers
Portugal under-21 international footballers
Portugal international footballers
Olympic footballers of Portugal
Footballers at the 1996 Summer Olympics
Portuguese football managers
Primeira Liga managers
Liga Portugal 2 managers
Académico de Viseu F.C. managers
F.C. Penafiel managers
Boavista F.C. managers
S.C. Beira-Mar managers
C.D. Tondela managers
Kuwait national football team managers
Portuguese expatriate football managers
Expatriate football managers in Thailand
Expatriate football managers in Kuwait
Portuguese expatriate sportspeople in Thailand
Portuguese expatriate sportspeople in Kuwait